Kaanch Ki Guriya is a 2015 Pakistani drama serial directed by Nadeem Siddiqui, produced by Asif Raza Mir and Babar Javed under their production banner A&B Entertainment and written by Faiza Iftikhar. It focuses on the lives of middle-class girls being clear like glasses and feel broken due to severe sufferings of life just like the glass is broken if fallen down, particularly it revolves around Manaal (Yumna) and her sufferings of life being an orphan.

The drama stars Sami Khan and Yumna Zaidi in their third on-screen appearance after Teri Raah Main Rul Gai and Meri Dulari. The drama was first aired 30 March 2015 on Geo TV.

Synopsis 
Manaal, played by Yumna Zaidi, is a young woman, has a loving mother and father and is attending nursing school. Tragedy strikes when she loses both parents, finds out who her surviving relatives are and goes to live with them, but suffers even more devastating events at their hands.  On her way to finally maturing and learning about life, Diam, (her grandfather's right-hand man), guides her with lessons to achieving her rightful place in her family and ultimately, love.

Though Manaal, (also known as Gurya/Guriya, which translates to Doll in English),  grows up in a poor household with limited resources but her parents  love for her and each other, conquers everything else. However Manaal's world comes crashing down when her parents die, in two separate incidents. Shattered by the loss, Manaal comes face to face with the harsh realities of life when everyone refuses to take responsibility for her and she is left completely abandoned.

Manaal's aunt, Shabnam, comes to her rescue by taking her in, but soon Manaal finds out things aren't what they seem.  Fortunately, at great risk to herself,  Shabnam sends Gurya/Guriya off to her grandfather, who is a rich industrialist in Karachi.  Manaal is surprised to see how the rich and lavish lifestyle of her mother's family lives. Overwhelmed and intimidated  by everyone in the house, under Diam's supervision, Manaal tries to befriend everyone by taking care of them. 

Oftentimes, in these attempts,  she is humiliated and looked down upon or made to feel inadequate. Amidst this, Manaal meets Daim, played by Sami Khan, who was adopted by the family when he was young. Manaal and Daim's mutual interests leads them to fall in love and their affection for each other grows. However, once again Manaal's life is struck by tragedy when her grandfather passes away and she is forced to move back to her Aunt Shabnam's;  But the conditions put on both Gurya/Guriya and Shabnam are, she must first marry her scheming cousin, Shujaat. Fearing for Gurya/Guriya's safety, Shabnam agrees to her son's plan.  The situation spirals downward when Shujaat uses his position to make Manaal suffer for perceived slights and out of sheer spite. Under her husband's abusive behaviour, Gurya/Guriya begins to lose all faith. Meanwhile, Daim, who disappeared after his adopted Father's death, faces difficulty forgetting Manaal. Will destiny bring Manaal and Daim together or will they continue to suffer without each other?

Cast
Sami Khan as Daim
Yumna Zaidi as Manaal
Zainab Qayyum as Shabnam
Qavi Khan as Grandfather
Behroze Sabzwari as Karim
Salma Zafar as Tasneem
Jinaan Hussain as Joya
Hina Khawaja Bayat as Naila
Farah Shah as Joya's mother
Lubna Aslam as Saliha
Qaiser Naqvi as Saliha's mother
Shezeen Rahat as Baila
Bilal Qureshi as Shujaat
Hareb Farooq as Moeed

Soundtrack 
The original soundtrack for Kaanch Ki Guriya was composed by Waqar Ali and sung by Alycia Dias.

References

External links 
 Kaanch Ki Guriya on Har Pal Geo

Geo TV original programming
Pakistani drama television series